Sobienie may refer to the following places in Poland:

Sobienie Biskupie
Sobienie Kiełczewskie Drugie
Sobienie Kiełczewskie Pierwsze
Sobienie Szlacheckie
Sobienie-Jeziory